Juodkaimiai (formerly) is a village in Kėdainiai district municipality, in Kaunas County, in central Lithuania. According to the 2011 census, the village had a population of 211 people. It is located next to Josvainiai town from its southern side, on the right bank of the Šušvė river, by the road  Aristava-Kėdainiai-Cinkiškiai. There is Josvainiai forestry in Juodkaimiai.

Demography

Images

References

Villages in Kaunas County
Kėdainiai District Municipality